Narcissus rupicola is a species of the genus Narcissus (daffodils) in the family Amaryllidaceae. It is classified in Section Jonquillae.

Distribution and habitat 
Narcissus rupicola is native to the central Iberian Peninsula. It grows in rocky places, including ledges and rock crevices where there is very little soil substrate.

References 

rupicola
Garden plants
Flora of Spain